KJOQ (1490 AM, "Worship 24/7") is a commercial AM radio station in Duluth, Minnesota. Established in 1963 as KAOH, the station is owned by Daniel and Alana Hatfield, through licensee Twin Ports Radio, LLC, and airs a worship music format. The studios are located in Duluth's Central Hillside at 806 East 4th street in Duluth.  The AM transmitter is located off Maryland Avenue in Superior, Wisconsin and the 100.9 FM translator is co-located with former sister station WWPE-FM 92.1 in the Duluth antenna farm.

History
The then-KQDS previously aired a progressive talk radio format with programming from Air America Radio along with The Ed Schultz Show until February 2007, when it began airing an oldies format with Scott Shannon's True Oldies Channel from ABC Radio.

On January 5, 2009, KQDS became the Duluth-Superior media market home of the FAN Radio Network, based at KFXN-FM in Minneapolis. On March 2, 2015, its sister station, 92.1 WWAX began carrying FAN Radio Network programming while KQDS became a full-time network affiliate of the NBC Sports Radio Network.

On April 19, 2017 Red Rock Radio announced that it would sell KQDS and WWAX to Twin Ports Radio for $200,000; through a time brokerage agreement, Twin Ports assumed control of the stations on May 1. Twin Ports' owner, Dan Hatfield, also runs Christian radio station WJRF; following the sale, WWAX and KQDS were to move their studios to WJRF's facilities, but would retain their sports formats. The terms of the sale required KQDS to change its call letters. Upon consummation of the sale on June 30, 2017, KQDS changed their call letters to KJOQ and rebranded as "The Jock 1490".

At the end of February 2021, it was announced that the Oregon-based radio network Worship 24/7 would begin operations on KJOQ by March 8 of the same year. On March 7, 2021, KJOQ switched to the Worship 24/7 network.

References

External links

Radio stations in Duluth, Minnesota
Radio stations established in 1963
1963 establishments in Minnesota